The Dor River is a small river near Havelian City District Abbottabad in Khyber Pakhtunkhwa province of Pakistan.

History 
The Dor River has a rich history in the Hazara region of KPK. it connects Karakoram Highway to Gilgit-Baltistan and other parts of Pakistan with the help of Ayub bridge.

References

Rivers of Khyber Pakhtunkhwa